Birchwood is a civil parish in the north-eastern part of Warrington, England.

Birchwood may also refer to: 
 the Birch tree and its wood

Novels
 Birchwood, 1973 novel by John Banville

People 
 Selwyn Birchwood (born 1985), American blues guitarist

Places 
In England
 Birchwood,  Lincolnshire 
 Lower Birchwood and Upper Birchwood, Derbyshire

In New Zealand
 Birchwood, New Zealand, a locality in the Southland Region

In the United States
 Birchwood (Arlington, Virginia), a historic log house in Arlington County, Virginia
 Birchwood, Wisconsin, a village
 Birchwood (town), Wisconsin, a town
 Birchwood, Kewaunee County, Wisconsin, an unincorporated community
 Birchwood Village, Minnesota